Frank Edward Kendrick (born September 11, 1950) is an American retired professional basketball player from Indianapolis, Indiana who played in the National Basketball Association (NBA).

College career

As an All-American selection playing at Indianapolis Tech, Frank Kendrick attended Purdue University, located in West Lafayette, Indiana. He played basketball under head coach George King in his sophomore season. Playing under Fred Schaus in his last two seasons at Purdue, he led the Boilers to the 1974 NIT Championship, scoring a team high 25 points against Utah. He was selected as the team MVP and as a First Team All-Big Ten selection during his Junior and Senior seasons while averaging 18.5 points per game in both seasons.  He was named a Helms Athletic Foundation All-American following his senior season.  He finished his career at Purdue with 1,269 points, #22 All-Time at Purdue; 664 rebounds (#9 All-Time) and 29 double-doubles. Frank helped lead the team to an overall 48–30 record in his three varsity seasons, which includes a 24-18 Big Ten Conference record.

Professional career

Golden State Warriors
Kendrick was the 47th pick in the 3rd round of the 1974 NBA Draft. He played one season (1974–1975) in the National Basketball Association as a member of the Golden State Warriors. Playing alongside Rick Barry and fellow rookie Jamaal Wilkes in 24 games, he averaged 3.3 points per game and shot 40.3 percent from the field.  Kendrick was dropped from the Warriors’ roster in mid season to make room for veteran Bill Bridges. The Warriors went on to win the 1975 NBA Championship and Kendrick won a championship ring in his only NBA season.

Euro League
After one season in the NBA, Kendrick moved overseas where he spent a decade in several European (France, Belgium and Switzerland) leagues.

Coaching career

Purdue
After his professional career, he returned to his alma mater and joined the Purdue bench with fellow assistant coaches Steve Lavin and Bruce Weber under head coach Gene Keady. He's well known for recruiting John R. Wooden Award winner and NBA All-Star Glenn Robinson to play at Purdue. He helped Purdue to an overall record of 222-96, which included nine NCAA tournament appearances and one NIT appearance. After ten years on the Purdue bench, another former Boilermaker, Cuonzo Martin, became an assistant a year later.

He was involved in an NCAA investigation for alleged recruiting violations at Purdue in 1995.   Purdue ultimately paid $80,000 in fines and Kendrick left Purdue the next season.

Gary Steelheads
After ten seasons on the Boilermakers bench, he moved on to coach the Gary Steelheads, a first-year franchise team located in Gary, Indiana in the CBA. He drafted two former Boilers in Jaraan Cornell and Chad Austin.

Other
Frank currently runs basketball camps, which consists of other former Purdue, IBA, and NBA players. In 2002, he was inducted into the Indiana Basketball Hall of Fame. He spent two seasons (2009-10 & 2010-11) as the head coach of his high school alma mater, Indianapolis Arsenal Tech High School.  He currently is employed at Pike High School as the Dean of Students.

References

External links
 

1950 births
Living people
American expatriate basketball people in France
American men's basketball players
Arsenal Technical High School alumni
Basketball coaches from Indiana
Basketball players from Indianapolis
Continental Basketball Association coaches
Golden State Warriors draft picks
Golden State Warriors players
Purdue Boilermakers men's basketball players
Small forwards